Kalyanpur, which means "City of Progress", may refer to:

Places

India

 Kalyanpur village, Saran district, Bihar
 Kalyanpur, Goalpara, Assam
 Kalyanpur, Bhopal (census code 482425), a village in Huzur tehsil of Bhopal district, Madhya Pradesh, located near Sukhi Sewaniya railway station and Bhopal Bypass road
 Kalyanpur, Bhopal (census code 482497), a village in Huzur tehsil of Bhopal district, Madhya Pradesh, located near Bhopal-Sehore road
 Kalyanpur, Maharashtra
 Kalyanpur, Karnataka
 Kalyanpur, Puri, Odisha
 Kalyanpur, Rajasthan
 Kalyanpur, Baruipur, West Bengal
 Kalyanpur, Howrah, West Bengal
 Kalyanpur, Uttar Pradesh
 Jam-Kalyanpur, Gujarat, in Devbhumi Dwarka district
 Kalyanpur village , baleswar district  Odisha ranjit

Bangladesh
 Kallyanpur, a neighbourhood of Dhaka
 A union of Chandpur Sadar Upazila

Nepal
 Kalyanpur, Bagmati, a village development committee in Nuwakot District in the Bagmati Zone 
 Kalyanpur, Sagarmatha, headquarters of Khadak Municipality in Saptari District
 Kalyanpur Jabadi, a village development committee in Siraha District in the Sagarmatha Zone

Electoral constituencies 
 Kalyanpur, Purvi Champaran (Vidhan Sabha constituency), Bihar
 Kalyanpur, Samastipur (Vidhan Sabha constituency), Bihar
 Kalyanpur, Kanpur (Vidhan Sabha constituency), Uttar Pradesh
 Kalyanpur, Howrah (Vidhan Sabha constituency), West Bengal

See also
 Kalyanpura (disambiguation)